Jessica Marie Penne (born January 30, 1983) is an American professional mixed martial artist.  Penne currently competes in the Women's Strawweight division for the Ultimate Fighting Championship (UFC). She was the first Invicta FC Atomweight Champion. She also competed in the first women's bout in Bellator Fighting Championships.

Background
Penne was born in Newport Beach, California, on January 30, 1983, and graduated from Diamond Bar High School, participating on the softball and swimming teams. Next at Cal State Fullerton, she earned her Bachelor of Arts in Communication. Penne is Italian American. Her father is the first generation of his Italian family born in the United States. Some of his family members remain in his family’s originating area of Turino, Italy.

Mixed martial arts career

Bellator
In May 2009, Penne became the first woman to compete and win a bout in the Bellator Fighting Championships organization when she fought at Bellator 5 against Tammie Schneider in a 117-pound catchweight bout. She won the fight via TKO (punches) in the first round.

In August 2010, Penne met future Bellator Strawweight Champion Zoila Gurgel in the opening quarterfinal round of the Bellator Season 3 115 lb women's tournament at Bellator 25. Penne lost the fight via unanimous decision.

Shoot Boxing
In September 2011, Penne agreed to fight two-time Girls S-Cup champion Rena Kubota in a shoot boxing bout in Japan. Shoot boxing allows kicks, punches, knees, throws, and standing submissions (chokeholds, armlocks and wristlocks). Penne was added to the Shoot Boxing 2011: Act 4 fight card against Rena Kubota a week before the event. Penne beat the heavily favored Kubota in a significant upset. The bout was ruled a majority draw after the first three scheduled rounds with scores of 29–29, 29–29, and 30–29 (Penne). The fight then went to a fourth extension round, which was judged a split draw with scores of 10–9 (Kubota), 10–9 (Penne), and 10–10. The fifth and final round went to the scorecards as well and Penne was awarded the majority decision (10–9, 10–9, and 9–9).

Invicta FC
In February 2012, it was announced that Penne was signed by the upstart all-women's promotion Invicta Fighting Championships.

On April 28, 2012, Penne made her Invicta debut at their inaugural event entitled Invicta FC 1: Coenen vs. Ruyssen, against Lisa Ellis in the co-main event. She won the fight via TKO (strikes) at 2:48 of round 3.

Penne competed once again for Invicta on October 6, 2012, this time headlining Invicta FC 3: Penne vs. Sugiyama against the then-#1 ranked Atomweight fighter in the world and Jewels 105-pound champion, Naho Sugiyama. The fight marked the first championship bout in Invicta's history, in any weight class. Penne became Invicta's first Atomweight champion when she defeated Sugiyama in the second round via triangle choke.

Penne's first defense of the championship headlined Invicta FC 5: Penne vs. Waterson when she defended against Michelle Waterson on April 5, 2013. Penne lost the fight and the championship via armbar submission in the fourth round.

Penne faced Nicdali Rivera-Calanoc at Invicta FC 6: Coenen vs. Cyborg on July 13, 2013. She defeated Rivera-Calanoc by submission due to a rear-naked choke in the first round. Penne received a "Submission of the Night" bonus for the victory.

The Ultimate Fighter
On July 3, 2014, it was announced that Penne was one of 16 contestants on The Ultimate Fighter: Team Pettis vs. Team Melendez, which would crown the Ultimate Fighting Championship's first strawweight champion.

Penne was the fifth pick by coach Anthony Pettis.  She faced Lisa Ellis in the preliminary round of the tournament and won via submission in the first round.  She defeated fellow Team Pettis teammate Aisling Daly in the quarterfinals via decision win. In the semifinal round, she lost to her friend Carla Esparza by decision.

Ultimate Fighting Championship
Penne made her UFC debut on December 12, 2014, at The Ultimate Fighter: A Champion Will Be Crowned Finale, facing fellow semifinalist Randa Markos on the main card. Penne won the back-and-forth fight by split decision (28–29, 30–27, and 29–28). The bout also won Penne her first Fight of the Night bonus award from the promotion.

Strawweight title shot
Penne was scheduled to face Juliana Lima on May 30, 2015, at UFC Fight Night 67.  However, Penne was pulled from that bout in favor of a match-up with UFC Women's Strawweight Champion Joanna Jędrzejczyk on June 20, 2015, at UFC Fight Night 69, after that event's headliner bout fell apart. She lost the fight in the third round via TKO following a flurry of punches and a knee against the cage.  Both participants were awarded Fight of the Night honors.

Post title shot
In her first fight following her title shot loss, Penne faced Jéssica Andrade on June 4, 2016, at UFC 199. She lost the fight via TKO in the second round.

Penne next faced Danielle Taylor on April 22, 2017, at UFC Fight Night: Swanson vs. Lobov. She lost the fight via unanimous decision.

On May 10, 2017, it was announced that Penne had been flagged by USADA for anti-doping violation from a March 2017 out of competition sample. Originally reported as negative, athlete biological passport abnormalities caused USADA to re-analyse the sample using Isotope-ratio mass spectrometry which detected an anabolic steroid of exogenous origin. On January 5, 2018, Penne was suspended for 18 months, a reduction of 6 months, due to her taking a DHEA supplement on a physicians recommendation. She was eligible to compete in October 2018.

Penne was scheduled to face Jodie Esquibel on February 17, 2019, at UFC on ESPN 1. At the weigh-ins, Penne weighed in at 118 pounds, 2 pounds over the strawweight non-title fight upper limit of 116 pounds. As a result, the bout was expected at catchweight and Penne was fined 20% of her purse which went to her opponent Esquibel.  However, Penne then injured her ankle on the morning of the fight and the bout was cancelled. The pair was rescheduled to meet on April 27, 2019, at UFC Fight Night: Jacaré vs. Hermansson. However, it was reported on April 18, 2019, that Penne pulled out of the bout, due to an injury, and she was replaced by Angela Hill.

Four-year ban from a drug test failure
Penne faced a four-year ban from competition from the United States Anti Doping Agency, following a second infraction of the USADA program. A GoFundMe page was set up to prepare a lawsuit against USADA, however in early February Penne's manager closed it down due to favorable progress with USADA. On February 28, 2020, it was reported that the suspension reduced from four years to 20 months. The suspension was retroactive from April 8, 2019, and Penne became eligible to fight again on December 8, 2020.

Returning to competition after suspension 
Penne's first fight after USADA suspension was scheduled to take place on March 27, 2021, against Hannah Goldy at UFC 260. However, Goldy pulled out of the fight on March 24, due to testing positive for COVID-19, and the bout was scrapped. The pairing was rescheduled to UFC on ESPN 22 on April 17, 2021. A week before the bout, Goldy pulled out of the event, and she was replaced by LFA Women's Strawweight champion Lupita Godinez. Penne won the close bout via split decision. 11 out of 17 media scores gave it to Godinez.

Penne faced Karolina Kowalkiewicz on August 7, 2021, at UFC 265. She won the fight via an arm bar in round one.  This fight earned her the  Performance of the Night award.

Penne was scheduled to face Luana Pinheiro on November 20, 2021, at UFC Fight Night 198. However Penne withdrew from the bout for undisclosed reason and she was replaced by Sam Hughes. Penne was rescheduled to face Pinheiro on April 30, 2022, at UFC on ESPN 35. They were once again scrapped as Pinheiro pulled out due to an undisclosed injury.

Penne was scheduled to face Brianna Fortino on July 16, 2022, at UFC on ABC 3. However, Fortino withdrew in early June for unknown reasons and was replaced by Emily Ducote. She lost the fight via unanimous decision.

Cheyanne Vlismas was scheduled to face Tabatha Ricci, but Penne stepped in replacing Vlismas, who pulled out for October 1, 2022, at UFC Fight Night 211, however the fight was cancelled due to an illness with Penne on the day of the weigh in's. 

Penne faced Tabatha Ricci on March 4, 2023, at UFC 285. She lost the fight via an armbar in the second round.

Fighting style
Penne is a kickboxer who also utilizes grappling and jiu-jitsu. While standing, she often attacks with hooks, body kicks, and knees from a clinch. Penne regularly attempts to take opponents to the mat, normally with clinches, trips, or takedown reversals. During a grappling session, she will usually attack with strikes before attempting a submission. Penne earned her black belt in Brazilian jiu-jitsu under Lucas Leite in January 2015.

Championships and accomplishments

Mixed martial arts
Ultimate Fighting Championship
Fight of the Night (Two times) 
Performance of the Night (One time) 
Invicta Fighting Championships
Atomweight Championship (One time; first)
Submission of the Night (One time)
Bellator Fighting Championships
Competed in and won the First Women's fight in Bellator history at Bellator 5
Women's MMA Awards
2013 Fight of the Year vs. Michelle Waterson on April 5
FightBooth.com
2012 Lady Violence Award

Mixed martial arts record

|-
|Loss
|align=center|14–7
|Tabatha Ricci
|Submission (armbar)
|UFC 285
|
|align=center|2
|align=center|2:14
|Las Vegas, Nevada, United States
|
|-
|Loss
|align=center|14–6
|Emily Ducote
|Decision (unanimous)
|UFC on ABC: Ortega vs. Rodríguez
|
|align=center|3
|align=center|5:00
|Elmont, New York, United States
|
|-
|Win
|align=center|14–5
|Karolina Kowalkiewicz
|Submission (armbar)
|UFC 265 
|
|align=center|1
|align=center|4:32
|Houston, Texas, United States
|
|-
|Win
|align=center|13–5
|Lupita Godinez
|Decision (split)
|UFC on ESPN: Whittaker vs. Gastelum
|
|align=center|3
|align=center|5:00
|Las Vegas, Nevada, United States
|
|-
|Loss
|align=center|12–5
|Danielle Taylor
|Decision (unanimous)
|UFC Fight Night: Swanson vs. Lobov
|
|align=center|3
|align=center|5:00
|Nashville, Tennessee, United States
|
|-
|Loss
|align=center|12–4
|Jéssica Andrade
|TKO (punches)
|UFC 199
|
|align=center|2
|align=center|2:56
|Inglewood, California, United States
|
|-
|Loss
|align=center|12–3
|Joanna Jędrzejczyk
|TKO (punches and knee)
|UFC Fight Night: Jędrzejczyk vs. Penne
|
|align=center|3
|align=center|4:22
|Berlin, Germany
|
|-
| Win
| align=center| 12–2
| Randa Markos
| Decision (split)
| The Ultimate Fighter: A Champion Will Be Crowned Finale
| 
| align=center| 3
| align=center| 5:00
| Las Vegas, Nevada, United States
|
|-
| Win
| align=center| 11–2
| Nicdali Rivera-Calanoc
| Submission (rear-naked choke)
| Invicta FC 6: Coenen vs. Cyborg
| 
| align=center| 1
| align=center| 4:57
| Kansas City, Missouri, United States
| 
|-
| Loss
|align=center| 10–2
| Michelle Waterson
| Submission (armbar)
| Invicta FC 5: Penne vs. Waterson
| 
|align=center| 4
|align=center| 2:31
| Kansas City, Missouri, United States
| 
|-
| Win
| align=center| 10–1
| Naho Sugiyama
| Submission (triangle choke)
| Invicta FC 3: Penne vs. Sugiyama
| 
| align=center| 2
| align=center| 2:20
| Kansas City, Kansas, United States
| 
|-
| Win
| align=center| 9–1
| Lisa Ellis
| TKO (punches)
| Invicta FC 1: Coenen vs. Ruyssen
| 
| align=center| 3
| align=center| 2:48
| Kansas City, Kansas, United States
| 
|-
| Win
| align=center| 8–1
| Amy Davis
| Submission (rear-naked choke)
| The Cage Inc.: Battle at the Border 7
| 
| align=center| 1
| align=center| 4:17
| Hankinson, North Dakota, United States
| 
|-
| Loss
| align=center| 7–1
| Zoila Frausto
| Decision (unanimous)
| Bellator 25
| 
| align=center| 3
| align=center| 5:00
| Chicago, Illinois, United States
|
|-
| Win
| align=center| 7–0
| Angela Magaña
| Submission (rear-naked choke)
| Action Fight League: Rock-N-Rumble
| 
| align=center| 2
| align=center| 4:10
| Hollywood, Florida, United States
| 
|-
| Win
| style="text-align:center;"| 6–0
| Tammie Schneider
| TKO (punches)
| Bellator 5
| 
| align=center| 1
| align=center| 1:35
| Dayton, Ohio, United States
|
|-
| Win
| align=center| 5–0
| Alicia Gumm
| Decision (unanimous)
| RMBB: Caged Vengeance
| 
| align=center| 2
| align=center| 5:00
| Sheridan, Colorado, United States
| 
|-
| Win
| style="text-align:center;"| 4–0
| Heather Basquil
| Decision (unanimous)
| Fist Series: WinterFist 2008
| 
| align=center| 3
| align=center| 3:00
| Orange County, California, United States
| 
|-
| Win
| align=center| 3–0
| Sumie Sakai
| Submission (armbar)
| FFF 2: Girls Night Out
| 
| align=center| 3
| align=center| 0:33
| Compton, California, United States
| 
|-
| Win
| align=center| 2–0
| Brandy Nerney
| Submission (rear-naked choke)
| FFF 1: Asian Invasion
| 
| align=center| 1
| align=center| 1:20
| Los Angeles, California, United States
| 
|-
| Win
| align=center| 1–0
| Sally Krumdiack
| Submission (arm-triangle choke)
| HOOKnSHOOT: The Women Return
| 
| align=center| 1
| align=center| 4:20
| Evansville, Indiana, United States
| 

|-
|Loss
|align=center|2–1
| Carla Esparza
| Decision (unanimous) 
| rowspan=3|The Ultimate Fighter: A Champion Will Be Crowned
| (airdate)
|align=center|3
|align=center|5:00
|rowspan=3|Las Vegas, Nevada, United States
|
|-
|Win
|align=center|2–0
| Aisling Daly
| Decision (unanimous) 
| (airdate)
|align=center|3
|align=center|5:00
|
|-
|Win
|align=center|1–0
| Lisa Ellis
| Submission (rear-naked choke) 
| (airdate)
|align=center|1
|align=center|3:46
|

Shoot boxing record

|-
| Win
| style="text-align:center;"| 1–0
| Rena Kubota
| Decision (majority)
| Shoot Boxing 2011: Act 4
| 
| style="text-align:center;"| 5 (Ex.2)
| style="text-align:center;"| 3:00
| Koto, Tokyo, Japan
| 
|-

See also
 List of current UFC fighters
 List of female mixed martial artists

References

External links
 
 

1983 births
Mixed martial artists from California
Sportspeople from Newport Beach, California
American people of Italian descent
American female mixed martial artists
American female kickboxers
American sportspeople in doping cases
Doping cases in mixed martial arts
Strawweight mixed martial artists
Atomweight mixed martial artists
Mixed martial artists utilizing judo
Mixed martial artists utilizing shootboxing
Mixed martial artists utilizing Brazilian jiu-jitsu
Living people
American practitioners of Brazilian jiu-jitsu
People awarded a black belt in Brazilian jiu-jitsu
Female Brazilian jiu-jitsu practitioners
American female judoka
Ultimate Fighting Championship female fighters
People of Piedmontese descent
21st-century American women